Wyatt Cole Ray (born October 24, 1996) is an American football outside linebacker for the Denver Broncos of the National Football League (NFL). He was signed by the Cleveland Browns as an undrafted free agent in 2019 following his college football career with Boston College.

Professional career

Cleveland Browns
Ray signed with the Cleveland Browns as an undrafted free agent following the 2019 NFL Draft on May 3, 2019. He was waived during final roster cuts on August 31, 2019.

Houston Texans
Ray signed to the Houston Texans' practice squad on September 2, 2019. He was released on October 3, 2019.

Buffalo Bills
Ray signed to the Buffalo Bills' practice squad on October 8, 2019. He was released on November 6, 2019.

New York Jets
Ray signed to the New York Jets' practice squad on November 25, 2019. He signed a reserve/futures contract with the team after the season on December 30, 2019. He was waived on August 3, 2020.

Tennessee Titans
Ray signed with the Tennessee Titans on August 13, 2020. He was waived during final roster cuts on September 5, 2020, and signed to the team's practice squad two days later. He was elevated to the active roster on November 7, December 12, and December 19 for the team's weeks 9, 14, and 15 games against the Chicago Bears, Jacksonville Jaguars, and Detroit Lions, and reverted to the practice squad after each game. He was signed to the active roster on December 24, 2020. In Week 16 against the Green Bay Packers on Sunday Night Football, Ray recorded his first career sack on Aaron Rodgers during the 40–14 loss. Ray finished the 2020 season with one tackle and one sack.

He was released as apart of the final roster cuts on August 31, 2021.

Cincinnati Bengals
On September 1, 2021, Ray was claimed off waivers by the Cincinnati Bengals.

Jacksonville Jaguars
Ray signed with the Jacksonville Jaguars on June 14, 2022. He was waived on August 22.

Tennessee Titans (second stint)
On September 22, 2022, Ray was signed to the Tennessee Titans practice squad. He was promoted to the active roster two days later. He was waived on October 4 and re-signed to the practice squad. On December 6, the Titans released Ray.

Denver Broncos
On December 14, 2022, Ray was signed to the Denver Broncos practice squad. He signed a reserve/future contract on January 9, 2023.

Personal
Ray is the grandson of singer Nat King Cole and nephew of singer Natalie Cole.

References

External links
Tennessee Titans bio
Boston College Eagles football bio

1996 births
Living people
People from Boca Raton, Florida
Players of American football from Florida
American football defensive ends
Boston College Eagles football players
Cleveland Browns players
Houston Texans players
Buffalo Bills players
New York Jets players
Tennessee Titans players
Cincinnati Bengals players
Jacksonville Jaguars players
Denver Broncos players